"Flying to My Home" is a song written by Paul McCartney. It was released as the B-side to the "My Brave Face" single from the album Flowers in the Dirt. The song ended up being placed into the Paul McCartney lyrics book titled Blackbird Singing numerous years following its initial release. The song is available on the 1993 remastered CD version of Flowers in the Dirt. It was also included on The 7" Singles Box in 2022.

Personnel
Paul McCartney — Lead Vocals, backing vocals, bass, electric and slide guitar, autoharp, organ, percussion, drums
Hamish Stuart — Acoustic and electric guitar, backing vocals
Chris Whitten — Drums, synthesizer, backing vocals
Linda McCartney - Backing Vocals

References 

Paul McCartney songs
1989 songs
Songs written by Paul McCartney
Song recordings produced by Paul McCartney
Songs written by Elvis Costello